In optics, Miller's rule is an empirical rule which gives an estimate of the order of magnitude of the nonlinear coefficient.

The proportionality coefficient is known as Miller's coefficient .

Definition 
The first order susceptibility response is given by:

where:
  is the frequency of oscillation of the electric field;
 N  is the number density of oscillating charge carriers (electrons);
 q is the fundamental charge;
 m is the mass of the oscillating charges, the electron mass;
  is the electric permittivity of free space;
 i is the imaginary unit;
  is the free carrier relaxation time;

For simplicity, we can define , and hence rewrite :

The second order susceptibility response is given by:

where  is the first anharmonicity coefficient.
It is easy to show that we can thus express  in terms of a product of 

References 

Nonlinear optics